State Roads in the U.S. state of Indiana are numbered rationally: in general, odd one-digit and two-digit highways are north–south highways, numbers increasing toward the west; even one-digit and two-digit highways are east-west highways, numbers increasing toward the south, the opposite of the Interstate Highway System. Three-digit highways are related, as a rule, to the single-digit or two-digit parent US or State Road; thus State Road 205 (SR 205) is related to SR 5, and SR 120 is related to U.S. Highway 20 (US 20).

Exceptions to this system are SR 37, SR 47, SR 56, SR 57, SR 62, and SR 67, diagonal routes, the defunct SR 100 beltline around Indianapolis, SR 135 (which acts like a two-digit state highway), and both SR 149 and SR 249 (which are arterials between SR 49 and SR 51). With the completion of the Lewis and Clark Bridge Indiana 265 now exists as a part of Interstate 265.

The numbers of several important U.S. Highways that travel through Indiana are not used as State Road numbers: these include 6, 12, 20, 24, 27, 30, 31, 33, 35, 36, 40, 41, 50, and 52. US 40, in fact, roughly corresponds in location to where "SR 40" would be; SR 38 is north of it and SR 42 is south of it. US 6 is located similarly, and, in fact, follows the general course of former SR 6.

Mainline highways

Special routes

See also

Notes

References

External links

 
State highways